The Wusum Stars of Bombali commonly referred to as simply Wusum Stars, is a Sierra Leonean professional football club based in Makeni, Sierra Leone. They are member of Sierra Leone National Premier League, the top football league in Sierra Leone. The club represent the Bombali District. Their home matches are played at Wusum Stadium in Makeni. Wusum Stars won the Sierra Leone FA Cup in 1979.

Achievements
Sierra Leonean FA Cup: 1
 1979

Performance in CAF competitions
CAF Cup Winners' Cup: 1 appearance
1980 – First Round

References 

Football clubs in Sierra Leone
Makeni